Sciomyzinae is a subfamily of flies in the family Sciomyzidae.

Genera

Tribe Sciomyzini
Apteromicra Papp, 2004
Atrichomelina Cresson, 1920
Calliscia Steyskal, 1975
Colobaea Zetterstedt, 1837
Ditaeniella Sack, 1939
Neuzina Marinoni & Knutson, 2004
Oidematops Cresson, 1920
Parectinocera Becker, 1919
Pherbellia Robineau-Desvoidy, 1830
Pseudomelina Malloch, 1933
Psacadina Enderlein, 1939
Pteromicra Lioy, 1864
Sciomyza Fallén, 1820
Tetanura Fallén, 1820
Tribe Tetanocerini
Anticheta Haliday, 1838
Chasmacryptum Becker, 1907
Coremacera Rondani, 1856
Dichetophora Rondani, 1868
Dictya Meigen, 1803
Dictyacium Steyskal, 1956
Dictyodes Malloch, 1933
Ectinocera Zetterstedt, 1838
Elgiva Meigen, 1838
Ethiolimnia Verbeke, 1950
Eulimnia Tonnoir & Malloch, 1928
Euthycera Latreille, 1829
Euthycerina Malloch, 1933
Eutrichomelina Steyskal, in Steyskal & Knutson, 1975
Guatemalia Steyskal, 1960
Hedria Steyskal, 1954
Hoplodictya Cresson, 1920
Hydromya Robineau-Desvoidy, 1830
Ilione Haliday in Curtis, 1837
Limnia Robineau-Desvoidy, 1830
"Neodictya" Elberg, 1965
Neolimnia Tonnoir & Malloch, 1928
Oligolimnia Mayer, 1953
Perilimnia Becker, 1919
Pherbecta Steyskal, 1956
Pherbina Robineau-Desvoidy, 1830
Poecilographa Melander, 1913
Protodictya Malloch, 1933
Psacadina Enderlein, 1939
Renocera Hendel, 1900
Sepedomerus Steyskal, 1973
Sepedon Latreille, 1804
Sepedonea Steyskal, 1973
Sepedonella Verbeke, 1950
Sepedoninus Verbeke, 1950
Shannonia Malloch, 1933
Steyskalina Knutson, 1999
Tetanocera Duméril, 1800
Tetanoceroides Malloch, 1933
Tetanoptera Verbeke, 1950
Teutoniomyia Hennig, 1952
Thecomyia Perty, 1833
Trypetolimnia Mayer, 1953
Trypetoptera Hendel, 1900
Verbekaria Knutson, 1968

References

Sciomyzidae